Bishop Kelley School can refer to:
Bishop Kelley High School in Tulsa, Oklahoma
Bishop Kelley Catholic School in Lapeer, Michigan